Mochi donuts, also known as poi mochi, are a fusion pastry crossing traditional American doughnuts and Japanese mochi. The mochi donuts' "hybrid batter makes for a doughnut that is fluffy and moist, with a satisfying chew". An early iteration can be traced to Hawaii in the early 1990s, however, the mochi donut was popularized by Mister Donut's "Pon de Ring" iteration in the early 2000s. Mochi donuts are now most commonly shaped into eight small balls connected into a circular shape that is easy to pull apart and are made out of glutinous rice flour or tapioca flour.

History and origins 

One of the earliest iterations of mochi donuts can be traced to the development of "poi mochi" by Charmaine Ocasek in Hawaii in 1992. This iteration is a fusion of American donuts and Japanese mochi and "consisted of deep-fried balls of mashed taro and mochiko, a Japanese short-grain sweet rice flour". 

This iteration of the hybrid confection was popularized in Japan before spreading to the United States via Hawaii. Hawaii "tends to catch on to Japanese food trends before the rest of the [United States], thanks to its larger population of Japanese-Americans and closer proximity to Japan". The "pon de ring" style is shaped into a ring of eight connected small balls. On calling the "pon de ring" style a mochi donut, Epicurious stated: "oddly enough, neither pon de ring or pão de queijo are made with glutinous rice flour. Both typically use tapioca flour, and while pão de queijo is gluten-free, most recipes for pon de ring also include wheat flour. [...] Some folks suggest the name has less to do with the glutinous rice flour that we often associate with foods called mochi and more to do with the phrase mochi-mochi, which describes a uniquely soft but elastic or even bouncy texture".

Modern preparation 
The Mister Donut style uses tapioca flour and produces mochi donuts that are easy to pull apart. Another variation developed in the United States uses glutinous rice flour which produces a denser mochi donut akin to Hawaiian-style butter mochi. Mochi donuts made from glutinous rice flour "typically contain half the amount of calories as the standard cake or yeast doughnut".

Equipment 
Although mochi donuts can be made by hand, for more efficiency most bakeries opt for machines that mold the dough into the traditional ring shape with a plunger and drops it directly into the oil.

Variations 
Mochi donuts can be found in various flavors and colors. Similar to "regular donuts, mochi donuts typically feature classic, buttery vanilla dough". Glazes which feature "Japanese flavors like matcha, pandan, and ube are common". Mochi donuts are often found garnished with different toppings such as chocolate chips, sesame seeds, grilled coconut chips, fresh or candied fruit, sprinkled with matcha powder, or cinnamon sugar.

Mister Donut offers seasonal themed variations along with various glazes, such as strawberry; they also offer a version made from chocolate dough and version that is cream filled.

Social media popularity 
Originally prevailing in Asia, mochi donuts rapidly gained popularity across the United States in recent years, encouraged by social media. The mochi donuts’ bright colors and playful shape, which is reminiscent of a flower or a bracelet, make them particularly photogenic and prone to trend on photo and video-sharing social platforms such as Instagram and TikTok.

See also
 List of doughnut varieties

References 

Japanese cuisine
Hawaiian desserts
Fried foods
American doughnuts
Doughnuts
Pastries